Embryo space colonization is a theoretical interstellar space colonization concept that involves sending a robotic mission to a habitable terrestrial planet, dwarf planet, minor planet or natural satellite transporting frozen early-stage human embryos or the technological or biological means to create human embryos. The proposal circumvents the most severe technological problems of other mainstream interstellar colonization concepts. In contrast to the sleeper ship proposal, it does not require the more technically challenging 'freezing' of fully developed humans (see cryonics).

Various concepts
Embryo space colonization concepts involve various concepts of delivering the embryos from Earth to an extrasolar planet around another star system. 
 The most straightforward concept is to make use of embryo cryopreservation. Modern medicine has made it possible to store frozen embryos in various low-development stages (up to several weeks into the development of the embryo).
 The technologically more challenging but more flexible scenario calls for just carrying the biological means to create embryos, that is various samples of donated sperm and egg cells.
 Self replicating machines could spread out to interstellar space, bring uploaded human minds with them and/or receive them via radio or laser transmission and build artificial electronic brains/bodies as needed. The uploaded humans can raise the children.

Mission at target planet

Regardless of the cargo used in any embryo space colonization scenario, the basic concept is that upon arrival of the embryo-carrying spacecraft (EIS) at the target planet, fully autonomous robots would build the first settlement on the planet and start growing food. More ambitiously, the planet may be terraformed first. Thereafter the first embryos could be unfrozen (or created using biosequenced or natural sperm and egg cells as outlined above).

In any event, one of the technologies needed for the proposal are artificial uteri. The embryos would need to develop in such artificial uteri until a large enough population existed to procreate by natural biological means.

Comparison to other interstellar colonization concepts
 Proposals of sleeper ships and generation ships require very large spacecraft to transport humans, life support systems and other equipment or food as well as an even larger propulsion system for a long period in time. Even optimistic proposals would require such a major effort for such ships that the resources required on Earth would involve a large part of mankind devoted to the mission or would even exceed available resources. In contrast, an EIS would have feasible small dimensions in the range of today's spacecraft, as the most important "cargo" would not need much space or weigh very much.
 Sleeper ship proposals call for freezing adult humans. While there is research into hibernation, the complexity of a living fully developed human body may make the sleeper ship proposals much more difficult.
 While sleeper ships and generation ships would deliver to a prospective colony world a population that has undergone some degree of education, training, and socialization in areas reconcilable with those of the sponsor culture (e.g. historical, scientific, and technical education, language acquisition, an understanding of the original mission and broader cultural norms), individuals who are born into colony worlds through embryo space colonization would initially lack this education.

Difficulties in implementing the concept

Like every proposal for interstellar colonization, embryo space colonization depends on solutions to still-unsolved technological problems. Some of these are:
 Robotics: Whether it will be possible to develop fully autonomous robots that can build the first settlement on the target planet and raise the first humans, is unclear. Because the initial probe must be maximally compact, the industrial robots that build the habitat would themselves have to be built autonomously from local materials. Though such technology does not yet exist, there are strong economic incentives to develop it, which are unrelated to space colonization.
 Artificial Intelligence: It would be challenging to create an artificial intelligence that could serve as an adequate artificial parent and successfully raise human children who have no contact with other human beings. Its design would have to include strategies for the transmission of terrestrial culture and language, as well as the prerequisites for healthy psychological functioning, to persons who cannot interact with Earth.
 Artificial uterus: Artificial wombs exist today but they are not available for full-term development of fetuses. Human embryos have been successfully grown in artificial uteri for 13 days. There is a 14-day rule, codified into law in twelve countries, preventing human embryos from being kept in artificial uteri past 14 days.
 Long-duration computers: Computer hardware would need to function reliably over long periods of time, in the range of several thousands of years. 
 Propulsion: Furthermore, a propulsion system would be required that could accelerate the EIS to a high speed and slow it down again upon nearing the destination.  Even assuming a speed one hundred times faster than any of today's space probes and a target planet within a couple of hundred light years would lead to a journey lasting several thousand years.
 Exoplanet found: Finally this depends on the existence of an exoplanet qualifying for colonization within a reachable distance. Current or future science missions like the Hubble, James Webb, or TESS space telescopes may very well yield results for this requirement in the near future.

Further unknowns that affect the feasibility of embryo space colonization are:

 Biological: Will genetic material survive intact on a space mission that could potentially last centuries? Exposure to cosmic rays is known to irreparably damage DNA. What other symbiotic lifeforms does a human need to live a healthy life? For example, gut flora and many other species of microorganisms may be necessary for proper biological and immunological functioning. Babies normally acquire these from their mothers and the wider environment, but this would not be the case for embryos in colonization ships.
 Ethical: In addition to the question of whether it is technically feasible to raise children without human contact, there is the further question of whether this is morally permissible. It is found to be unethical to deliberately create children that will grow up without parents, yet embryo space colonization requires this. Controversial value judgments would also need to be made about whose DNA should be the basis of the space colony. Should they be selected by some metric of merit, or randomly from the general population? Either choice presents ethical problems. Should the parenting AI firmly steer the children to maximize the chances of the colony's success, or should it accept the risk of allowing them significant autonomy? Which languages and cultural values should be transmitted to the colonists? Should they be raised according to some value system that exists on Earth, or create one that is somehow optimized? Are there truths that should be kept from them? The possibility of a new civilization that starts without a cultural legacy might appeal to cults that want their values to become a norm for an entire society. Is it permissible to allow them have their own embryo colonies, where the AI indoctrinates the colonists only in the cult's value system? The difficulty of answering these and other ethical questions may become a non-technological obstacle to embryo space colonization.

See also 
 Embryogenesis
 Uploaded astronaut

Notes

References
 A. Crowl; J. Hunt; A. M. Hein (2012), "Embryo Space Colonisation to Overcome the Interstellar Time Distance Bottleneck", Journal of the British Interplanetary Society, 65, 283-285.

Science fiction themes
Space colonization
Interstellar travel